This is a list of Polish inventors and discoverers. The following list comprises people from Poland and of Polish origin, and also people of predominantly Polish heritage, in alphabetical order of the surname.

A 
Bruno Abakanowicz: invented integrapf, a mechanical analog computing device for plotting the integral of a graphically defined function.
Osman Achmatowicz Jr.: specialist in the field of organic chemistry. Inventor of the Achmatowicz reaction.
Karol Adamiecki: management theorist. Together with Frederick Winslow Taylor and Henry Fayola the creator of organisation and management science. In 1925 Adamiecki founded the Polish Institute of Scientific Management.
Herman Auerbach: one of the most recognizable members of Lwów School of Mathematics, a student of famous mathematician, Stefan Banach.
Henryk Arctowski: scientist and explorer. Living in exile for a large part of his life, he was one of the first persons to reach Antarctica during winter and became an internationally renowned meteorologist.

B 
 Joseph Babinski: neurologist, discoverer of the Babinski reflex.
 Stefan Banach: considered one of the world's most important and influential 20th-century mathematicians, creator of Banach space. He was one of the founders of modern functional analysis, and an original member of the Lwów School of Mathematics. His major work was the 1932 book, Théorie des opérations linéaires (Theory of Linear Operations), the first monograph on the general theory of functional analysis.
 Feliks Barański: pioneer and the specialist in the field of Differential equations.
 Jan Józef Baranowski: took part in the Great Emigration. Invented Railway signal device, ticket machine and gas meter.
 Mieczysław G. Bekker: co-authored the general idea and vitally contributed to the design and construction of the Lunar Roving Vehicle (LRV) used by NASA in missions Apollo 15, Apollo 16, and Apollo 17 on the Moon. He was the author of several patented inventions in the area of off-the-road vehicles, including those for extraterrestrial use.
Benedict of Poland: Polish Franciscan friar, explorer, and interpreter, participant of the pioneering European trip to the capital of the Mongol Empire in the 13th century.
 Edmund Biernacki: physician, the first one to note a relationship between the sedimentation rate of red blood cells in a human blood sample and the general condition of the organism. This method is now known as the Biernacki Reaction.
 Michał Borysiekiewicz: invented the first "electronic eye" for blind people.
Michał Boym: 17th-century Jesuit missionary, scientist and explorer, who was the first in Europe to describe Korea as a peninsula, as until then it was believed to be an island, and the first in Europe to establish the factual location of a number of Chinese cities and the Great Wall of China.
 Josef Božek: managed to put into operation one of the first steam engines in the Czech lands.
 Stefan Bryła: designed and built the first welded road bridge in the world.
 Tytus Liwiusz Burattini: inventor of the micrometer.

C 
Maria Skłodowska-Curie: conducted pioneering research on radioactivity. She was the first woman to win a Nobel Prize, the first person and only woman to win twice, the only person to win a Nobel Prize in two different sciences – physics and chemistry. She was also the first woman to become a professor at the University of Paris, and in 1995 became the first woman to be entombed on her own merits in the Panthéon in Paris.
Nicolaus Copernicus (Mikołaj Kopernik): mathematician, physician, translator, diplomat. Most commonly known as an astronomer who formulated a model of the universe that placed the Sun rather than the Earth at the center of the universe included in his work De revolutionibus orbium coelestium (On the Revolutions of the Heavenly Spheres).
Napoleon Cybulski:, physiologist, discoverer of adrenaline, one of pioneers of endocrinology and electroencephalography.
Jan Czochralski: chemist, invented the Czochralski process, commonly used for growing crystals and in the production of semiconductor wafers.

D
Marian Danysz: physicist, co-discovered the hypernucleus.
Kazimierz Dąbrowski: psychologist, psychiatrist, and physician, author of the theory of "positive disintegration".
 Henryk Derczyński: a photographer, created an isohelia technology, a technique that sharpens contrasts and defines three-dimensional images.
 Stefan Drzewiecki: engineer and inventor, built the first submarine in the world with electric battery-powered propulsion.
Jan Dzierżon: apiarist who discovered the phenomenon of parthenogenesis in bees.

F
Max Factor (Maksymilian Faktorowicz): founder of the Max Factor cosmetics company, popularized the term "make-up", had perfected the first cosmetic specifically created for motion picture use—a thinner greasepaint in cream form.
Kazimierz Fajans: physical chemist, pioneer in the science of radioactivity and the discoverer of chemical element protactinium.
Kazimierz Funk: biochemist, considered to be the first to the concept of Vitamins and the term itself, first to postulate the existence of B1, B2, C, and D vitamins.
Edward Flatau: neurologist.
Julius Fromm: chemist, entrepreneur, one of the inventors of the rubber condom.
 Casimir Funk:, biochemist, generally credited with being among the first to formulate (1912) the concept of vitamins.

G 
David Ben-Gurion: Polish-Jewish politician, one of the key representatives of the Zionism movement, founding father and the first prime minister of Israel.
Leo Gerstenzang: Polish-American inventor who in 1923 created the first contemporary cotton swab or Q-Tips.
Andrzej Grzegorczyk: mathematician and logician, who introduced the Grzegorczyk hierarchy, a hierarchy of functions used in computability theory.
Rudolf Gundlach: military engineer, inventor and tank designer, inventor of the Vickers Tank Periscope MK.IV also known as the Gundlach Periscope.

H 
 Józef Hofmann: musician, invented Paper clips.

J
Wojciech Jastrzębowski: scientist, naturalist and inventor, one of the fathers of ergonomics.
 Walery Jaworski: one of the pioneers of gastroenterology in Poland.

K
Adam Adamandy Kochański: mathematician, physicist, clockmaker, who found an approximation of π today called the Kochański's Approximation. He also suggested replacing the clock's pendulum with a spring, constructed a clock with a magnetic pendulum, and was the author of the world's first systematic paper on the construction of clocks.
Tadeusz Kościuszko: Polish, Lithuanian, Belarusian and American war hero and military leader, military engineer, colonel in the Continental Army during the American Revolutionary War, creator of the West Point state-of-the-art Fortifications, prepared a national Kosciuszko Uprising in Poland against the Russian Empire and acted as the Supreme Commander.
Józef Kosacki: invented the Polish mine detector, a first man-portable device used by the allied forces during the World War II.
Jerzy Konorski: neurophysiologist, discoverer of secondary conditioned reflexes and operant conditioning. He also proposed the idea of gnostic neurons, a concept similar to the grandmother cell. He coined the term neural plasticity.
Hilary Koprowski: virologist and immunologist, who developed the world's first effective live polio vaccine
Tadeusz Krwawicz: ophthalmologist who pioneered the use of cryosurgery in ophthalmology.
Stefan Kudelski: audio engineer known for creating the Nagra series of professional audio recorders later sold to British BBC, American stations NBC, ABC, CBS, but also plenty of radio stations including famous Radio Luxembourg. Kudelski received prestigious Oscar Awards in 1965, 1977, 1978, and 1990. He also won two Emmy Awards in 1984 and 1986.
Stephanie Kwolek: American chemist of Polish origin, invented a polymer out of which kevlar is produced.
Jerzy Kukuczka: alpinist, the second man in history to climb all fourteen Eight-thousanders including three as first ascents, established a new route on K2 in alpine style called the "Polish line".
Wojciech Kurtyka: mountaineer, alpinist, one of the alpine style climbing pioneers, after climbing through the "Shining Wall" on Gasherbrum IV the Climbing magazine declared beat the wall to get the greatest achievement of mountaineering in the twentieth century.
Kazimierz Kordylewski: astronomer, discoverer of the Kordylewski clouds.

L, Ł 
Ignacy Łukasiewicz: designed and built both world's first oil refinery and oil well. Introduced the first modern street lamp in Europe.
Jan Łukasiewicz: invented RPN (Reverse Polish Notation) used in professional Calculators as well as by Computers in order to determine the order of mathematical operations without using parentheses.

M 
Ernest Malinowski: civil engineer best known for constructing the Ferrocarril Central Andino in the Peruvian Andes, the world's highest railway at the time
Henryk Manguski: a telecommunications engineer who worked for Motorola in Chicago. He was the inventor of the first Walkie-Talkies and one of the authors of his company success in the fields of radio communication.
Krzysztof Matyjaszewski: chemist, who discovered atom transfer radical polymerization.
Jan Mikulicz-Radecki: surgeon, inventor of new operating techniques and tools, one of the pioneers of antiseptics and aseptic techniques.
Ludwik Młokosiewicz: explorer, zoologist and botanist, who discovered 60 species of plants and animals in Georgia and the Caucasus.
Aleksander Możajski: Polish-Russian military officer, built world's first plane.

N 
Jan Nagórski: engineer and pioneer of aviation, the first person to fly an airplane in the Arctic and the first aviator to perform a loop with a flying boat.

O 
 Stanisław Olszewski: engineer and inventor, co-creator of modern electric arc welding.

P 
Antoni Patek: pioneer in watchmaking and the creator of the Patek Philippe & Co.
Jerzy Pniewski: physicist, co-discovered the hypernucleus.
Kazimierz Pułaski: a Polish nobleman, soldier and military strategist, a general in the Continental Army during the American Revolutionary War, the creator and the head of the Pulaski Cavalry Legion and reformer of the American cavalry. He distinguished himself throughout the revolution, most notably when he saved the life of George Washington. One of only eight people in the history to be awarded honorary United States citizenship.
Kazimierz Prószyński: patented the first film camera, the Pleograph, before the Lumière brothers, and later went on to improve the cinema projector for the Gaumont company, as well as invent the widely used hand-held Aeroscope camera.

R 
Zbigniew Religa: a pioneer in human heart transplantation in Poland, he led the team that performed the first successful heart transplantation in the country, and in June 1995 he was the first surgeon to graft an artificial valve created from materials taken from human corpses.
Marian Rejewski: mathematician and cryptologist who reconstructed the sight-unseen German military Enigma cipher machine.
Ludwik Rydygier: surgeon, who performed the first in Poland and second in the world successful surgical removal of the pylorus in a patient suffering from stomach cancer, and the first peptic ulcer resection in the world.

S 
Michael Sendivogius: pioneer of chemistry, who developed ways of purification and creation of various acids, metals and other chemical compounds, and discovered that air is not a single substance and contains a life-giving substance—later called oxygen.
Tadeusz Sendzimir: metallurgist, revolutionised galvanisation and rolling process
Kazimierz Siemienowicz: military engineer, one of pioneers of rocketry, author of Artis Magnae Artilleriae pars prima, a work that served as the principal artillery manual in Europe from the mid-16th to the mid-18th centuries, also containing the first printed design of a multistage rocket.
Maria Siemionow: transplant surgeon and scientist who led a team of eight surgeons through the world's first near-total face transplant.
Hugo Steinhaus: mathematician, specialist in the field of functional analysis.
Abraham Stern: inventor of the mechanical calculator, topography machine, agriculture machines.
Josephus Struthius: professor of medicine and personal doctor of Polish kings, who was among the first to provide a visual representation of the human pulse and used it for diagnostic purposes.
Paweł Edmund Strzelecki: explorer most commonly known for his early explorations of Australia, particularly the Snowy Mountains and Tasmania. Climbed and named the highest Australian peak – Mount Kosciuszko.
Jan Szczepanik: inventor, with several hundred patents and over 50 discoveries to his name; his inventions founded ground for radio and TV broadcasting.

Ś 
Jędrzej Śniadecki: writer, physician, chemist, biologist and philosopher, the first person who linked rickets to lack of sunlight.

T 
Abraham Icek Tuszyński: entrepreneur, founder of the most prestigious movie theater in the Netherlands – the Tuschinski Theater in Amsterdam.
Jacek Trzmiel: was a Polish American businessman, best known for founding Commodore International. Tramiel later formed Atari Corporation after he purchased the remnants of the original Atari, Inc. from its parent company.

U 
 Stanisław Ulam: mathematician, representing the Lwów School of Mathematics, one of the members of Manhattan Project. He was assigned to Edward Teller's group, where he worked on Teller's "Super" bomb for Teller and Enrico Fermi. With the aid of a cadre of female "computers", including his wife Françoise Aron Ulam, he found that Teller's "Super" design was unworkable. In January 1951, Ulam and Teller came up with the Teller–Ulam design, which is the basis for all Thermonuclear weapons. Discovered the concept of cellular automaton, invented the Monte Carlo method of computation, and suggested nuclear pulse propulsion. In pure and applied mathematics, he proved some theorems and proposed several conjectures.

W 
 Warner Brothers (Bracia Wonsal): American-naturalized brothers of Polish-Jewish origin, created the Warner Bros. Entertainment Inc., one of the biggest and most successful media corporations in the world being one of the "Big Six" American film studios.
Rudolf Weigl: biologist, physician and inventor, known for creating the first effective vaccine against epidemic typhus.
 Krzysztof Wielicki: regarded as one of the greatest mountaineers in history. He performed the first winter ascents on Mount Everest, Kangchenjunga, and Lhotse.
Mieczysław Wolfke: the forerunner of holography and television.

Z 
 Ludwik Zamenhof: creator of the Esperanto language.
Witold Zglenicki: geologist and inventor. Pioneer of oil extraction from sea bottom.

References 

Lists of inventors

Inventors
Inventors